Carver Middle High School is a public school located in Carver, Massachusetts, United States. This school was formerly two different schools, Carver Middle School (6–8) and Carver High School (9–12) in one building with both schools sharing the library and auditorium. The school became under one principal in 2008–09 school year. This school became officially Carver Middle High School the following school year. It is located at 60 South Meadow Rd. and has an enrollment of 489 students in grades 6–8, and 537 students in grades 9–12. The school's mascot is the Crusaders and the school colors are Maroon and Silver/Gray. The principal is Mr. Michael Schultz. The assistant principals are Mrs. Christine Cabral (6–8) and Mr. Michael Martin (9–12)

District 
Students enter Carver Middle High School at 6th grade from Carver Elementary School. Most students graduate and leave from the 12th grade here.

Other schools 
Eighth grade students may apply to a private school, Norfolk County Agricultural High School, Bristol County Agricultural High School, or Old Colony Regional Vocational Technical High School for high school. Students must apply and may be interviewed.

Transportation 
Carver has its own school buses. They have 15 bus routes, plus other routes to Special Needs schools, and to Agricultural.

Transportation to other schools 
Students going to Old Colony Regional Vocational Technical High School take a school bus provided by Old Colony, meanwhile students going to Norfolk County Agricultural High School or Bristol County Agricultural High School take a bus provided by the town.

Payment 
For the past few years Carver has had the money to pay for the buses, starting in 2004 for grades 10 and above. Grades 9 and below are always paid for by the town.

Athletics
Carver is well known for its wrestling and girls basketball program. Carver competes in the South Shore League. Michael Schultz is the director of the athletic program at CMHS.

In 2000, the football team made their first and only appearance in the MIAA Division 4B State Championship, but were ultimately defeated by powerhouse Fairhaven.

The baseball team advanced to the state championship in 1999, but were defeated by Northbridge by a score of 6-2.

Intramurals
Since no sports are offered in grades 6–7, grade 8 is allowed to partake in High School Sports, students can participate in intramural sports. A one-time payment must be made and a medical form must be turned in.

Notable alumni
 Mike Bennett, professional wrestler currently working in WWE

References

Educational institutions established in 1988
Schools in Plymouth County, Massachusetts
Public high schools in Massachusetts
1988 establishments in Massachusetts